The eastern long-necked turtle (Chelodina longicollis) is an east Australian species of snake-necked turtle that inhabits a wide variety of water bodies and is an opportunistic feeder. It is a side-necked turtle (Pleurodira), meaning that it bends its head sideways into its shell rather than pulling it directly back.

Distribution

The species is found throughout south eastern Australia where it is found west of Adelaide (South Australia) eastwards throughout Victoria, Northern Territory and New South Wales, and northwards to the Fitzroy River of Queensland. Where these turtles come in contact with Chelodina canni they freely hybridise, exhibiting hybrid vigor in the Styx River Drainage of Queensland.

Description

The carapace is generally black in color, though some may be brown. It is broad and flattened with a deep medial groove. The scutes are edged in black in those individuals with a lighter background color. The plastron is also very broad and is cream to yellow in color with sutures edged in black. The neck is long and narrow, typical of the subgenus Chelodina,  and reaches a length of approximately 60% of the carapace length. The neck has numerous small pointed tubercles and is grey to black in color dorsally, cream below, as is the narrow head. Females tend to grow to larger sizes and have deeper bodies. It is thought this is linked to productivity of the local environment.

When it feels threatened, this turtle will emit an offensive smelling fluid from its musk glands. This trait gives the turtle one of its other common names, "stinker".

The eastern long-necked turtle is carnivorous, eating a variety of animals. This includes insects, worms, tadpoles, frogs, small fish, crustaceans, molluscs, plankton, and carrion.

Reproduction

In early summer, the female will lay between two and ten eggs in the banks of her aquatic habitat. Three to five months later the hatchlings break out of their shells. These young turtles often fall prey to predators such as fish and birds. Females will lay one to three clutches of eggs per year.

Gallery

References

Turtles of Australia
Chelodina
Reptiles described in 1794